Elk Lake is a natural body of water in the central Cascade Range in the U.S. state of Oregon.

Nearby lakes include Hosmer, Sparks, Blow, Doris, Devils, Lava, and Little Lava.

Heavily used for recreation, the lake is among the most popular of the Cascade Lakes. Its name stems from the large number of elk that formerly frequented the area in summer. During winter, Elk Lake freezes, and access roads are usually closed by snow until late May.

Recreation
The United States Forest Service manages campgrounds, boat launches, and picnic sites at various locations around the lake, also served by a private resort with cabins. Lake activities include sailing, fishing, swimming, and windsurfing.

Hiking trails leading to other high-elevation lake groups, such as those in the Mink Lake basin, begin at Elk Lake.

See also
 List of lakes in Oregon

References

Deschutes National Forest
Lakes of Oregon
Lakes of Deschutes County, Oregon